Fabio Sabatini (born 18 February 1985 in Pescia) is an Italian former professional road bicycle racer, who last rode for UCI WorldTeam . Sabatini retired from competition at the end of the 2021 season.

Major results

2003
 1st  Time trial, National Junior Road Championships
2004
 5th Coppa Città di Asti Under-23
2005
 1st Coppa Città di Asti Under-23
 3rd Gran Premio della Liberazione
2006
 6th Delta Profronde
 8th Ronde van Drenthe
2007
 10th Firenze–Pistoia
2008
 7th Firenze–Pistoia
2009
 8th Vattenfall Cyclassics
2010
 2nd Classica Sarda
 3rd Gran Premio della Costa Etruschi
2013
 4th RideLondon–Surrey Classic
2016
 1st Stage 1 (TTT) Tour de San Luis
 8th Overall Giro di Toscana

Grand Tour general classification results timeline

References

External links 

1985 births
Living people
Italian male cyclists
People from Pescia
Sportspeople from the Province of Pistoia
Cyclists from Tuscany